Joseph Walter Andrew (17 April 1889 – 21 July 1982) was a former Australian rules footballer who played with Carlton in the Victorian Football League (VFL).

Notes

External links 

		
Joe Andrew's profile at Blueseum

1889 births
1982 deaths
Australian rules footballers from Melbourne
Carlton Football Club players
People from Carlton, Victoria